Spur 345 is a  route in Greater San Antonio in the U.S. state of Texas, maintained by the Texas Department of Transportation (TxDOT). It follows a former route of U.S. Route 87 (US 87) through Balcones Heights and northwest San Antonio. Known locally as Fredericksburg Road, it is a major arterial for the cities of San Antonio and Balcones Heights, providing access to the headquarters of United Services Automobile Association (USAA) and to the South Texas Medical Center.

Route description
Spur 345 follows Fredericksburg Road from the southern city limits of Balcones Heights. It crosses through that city, providing access to the Wonderland of the Americas shopping center, before crossing into San Antonio and intersecting Interstate 410 (I-410, Connally Loop). It continues north through the South Texas Medical Center before ending at I-10/US 87 (McDermott Freeway) on the northwest side of the city.

History
Spur 345 follows the original routing of US 87 on the northwest side of San Antonio. The road was designated as US 87 along this stretch in 1935. On January 26, 1962, when US 87 was rerouted onto the I-10 freeway to the east, the section of Fredericksburg Road was kept on the state highway system as Loop 345. It was signed as a business route of US 87 until 1990.

On December 18, 2014, the section from I-410 south to I-10 was removed from the state highway system, while the remaining segment was redesignated Spur 345 as part of TxDOT's San Antonio turnback program, which returned  of roadways to the city.

Junction list

References

345
Transportation in San Antonio
U.S. Route 87
Transportation in Bexar County, Texas